Beeks is an English surname. Notable people with this name include:

 Steve Beeks, English footballer and coach
 Jalen Beeks
 William T. Beeks
 Ricky Beeks
 Clarence Beeks

Other
 Beeks Place

See also
 Beek (disambiguation)

English-language surnames